The 1966 Kansas City Athletics season was the twelfth and penultimate season in Kansas City, and the 66th in overall franchise history.  It involved the A's finishing seventh in the American League with a record of 74 wins and 86 losses, 23 games behind the World Champion Baltimore Orioles. Paid attendance for the season was 773,929. The pitching staff had an earned run average of 3.56, which ranked sixth in the American League.

Offseason 
 October 15, 1965: Satchel Paige was released by the Athletics.
November 28, 1965: Hank Peters resigned from the club and became the minor league director for the Cleveland Indians.
 November 29, 1965: Ron Stone was drafted by the Athletics from the Baltimore Orioles in the 1965 rule 5 draft.
 December 1, 1965: Jim Landis and Jim Rittwage were traded by the Athletics to the Cleveland Indians for Joe Rudi and Phil Roof.
In early 1966, Jim Schaaf left the Athletics front office to work with the Kansas City Chiefs of the AFL.

Regular season 
The club won their home opener (contested on April 19) and proceeded to lose 14 of their next 16 games. From June 19 to the final game of the season, the club won 50 games and lost 49, their best stretch since playing in Kansas City. The Athletics did not finish in last place for the first time in three years.

Season standings

Record vs. opponents

Notable transactions 
 April 6, 1966: John O'Donoghue and cash were traded by the Athletics to the Cleveland Indians for Ralph Terry.
 April 13, 1966: Diego Seguí was purchased from the Athletics by the Washington Senators.
 May 27, 1966: Wayne Causey was traded by the Athletics to the Chicago White Sox for Danny Cater.
 June 7, 1966: 1966 Major League Baseball draft (June Draft) notable picks:
Round 1: Reggie Jackson (2nd pick) 
Round 5: Dave Hamilton
Round 6: Warren Bogle
Round 20: Larry Burchart (did not sign)
 July 1, 1966: Ron Stone was returned by the Athletics to the Baltimore Orioles.
 July 30, 1966: Jim Duckworth was traded by the Athletics to the Washington Senators for Diego Seguí.
August 6, 1966: Ralph Terry was purchased from the Athletics by the New York Mets.
August 24, 1966: 1966 Major League Baseball draft (August Legion) notable picks:
Round 1: Pete Varney (did not sign)

Roster

Player stats

Batting

Starters by position 
Note: Pos = Position; G = Games played; AB = At bats; H = Hits; Avg. = Batting average; HR = Home runs; RBI = Runs batted in

Other batters 
Note: G = Games played; AB = At bats; H = Hits; Avg. = Batting average; HR = Home runs; RBI = Runs batted in

Pitching

Starting pitchers 
Note: G = Games pitched; IP = Innings pitched; W = Wins; L = Losses; ERA = Earned run average; SO = Strikeouts

Other pitchers 
Note: G = Games pitched; IP = Innings pitched; W = Wins; L = Losses; ERA = Earned run average; SO = Strikeouts

Relief pitchers 
Note: G = Games pitched; W = Wins; L = Losses; SV = Saves; ERA = Earned run average; SO = Strikeouts

Farm system 

LEAGUE CHAMPIONS: Mobile, Modesto, Leesburg

References

External links
1966 Kansas City Athletics at Baseball Reference
1966 Kansas City Athletics at Baseball Almanac

Oakland Athletics seasons
Kansas City Athletics season
Kansas City Athletics